Stygioides colchica is a species of moth of the family Cossidae. It is found in Bulgaria, Greece, the southern part of European Russia, Ukraine, Turkey, Armenia, Lebanon and Israel.

Adults have been recorded on wing in May in Israel.

Subspecies
Stygioides colchicus colchicus
Stygioides colchicus dercetis (Grum-Grshimailo, 1899) (Israel, Jordan, Lebanon, Syria)

References

Moths described in 1851
Cossinae
Moths of Europe
Moths of Asia